Tetrarhanis is a genus of butterflies in the family Lycaenidae. The species of this genus are  endemic to the Afrotropical realm.

Species
Tetrarhanis baralingam (Larsen, 1998)
Tetrarhanis diversa (Bethune-Baker, 1904)
Tetrarhanis ilala (Riley, 1929)
Tetrarhanis ilma (Hewitson, 1873)
Tetrarhanis laminifer Clench, 1965
Tetrarhanis nubifera (Druce, 1910)
Tetrarhanis ogojae (Stempffer, 1961)
Tetrarhanis okwangwo Larsen, 1998
Tetrarhanis onitshae (Stempffer, 1962)
Tetrarhanis rougeoti (Stempffer, 1954)
Tetrarhanis schoutedeni (Berger, 1954)
Tetrarhanis simplex (Aurivillius, 1895)
Tetrarhanis souanke (Stempffer, 1962)
Tetrarhanis stempfferi (Berger, 1954)
Tetrarhanis symplocus Clench, 1965

References

Poritiinae
Lycaenidae genera
Taxa named by Ferdinand Karsch